The BBC Sports Personality of the Year Coach Award is an award given annually as part of the BBC Sports Personality of the Year ceremony each December. The award is given to the coach who was considered to have made the most substantive contribution to British sport in that year. The award is decided by a panel of over 30 sporting journalists. Each panellist votes for their top two choices; their first preference is awarded two points, and their second preference is awarded one point. The winning coach is the one with the largest points total. In the case of a points tie, the person chosen as first preference by the most panellists is the winner. If this is also a tie the award is shared.

The first recipient of the award was Manchester United manager Alex Ferguson in 1999. The award has been presented to a football manager on ten occasions. It has been awarded to nine Britons, and eleven of the other fourteen winners were European. Daniel Anderson, the only winner from the Southern Hemisphere, was in his native Australia at the time of the awards, so the then St. Helens captain, Paul Sculthorpe, collected it on his behalf. In 2007, Enzo Calzaghe was the first recipient of the award who had coached an individual and not a team. The most recent award was presented in 2022 to England Women's manager Sarina Wiegman, the first ever woman to win the award.

Winners

By year

By nationality 
This table lists the total number of awards won by coaches of each nationality based on the principle of jus soli.

By sport 
This table lists the total number of awards won by coaches' sporting profession.

References

General

Specific

Coach
British sports coaches
Awards established in 1999
1999 establishments in the United Kingdom
Coaching awards